Gulfport may refer to:

Places in USA
Gulfport, Florida
Gulfport, Illinois
Gulfport, Mississippi

Ships
 , two ships of this name
 , a Hansa A Type cargo ship in service 1947-64
 Gulfport was a prospective name for

Other uses 
 Gulfport station, a former train station in Gulfport, Mississippi, now a museum
 Gulfport (Staten Island Railway station), in New York
 Gulfport High School, in Gulfport, Mississippi
 Gulfport Open, a former PGA tournament played in Gulfport, Mississippi in the 1940s